Final Fantasy is a video game series developed and published by Square Enix (formerly Square). The first installment in the series, the eponymous Final Fantasy, premiered in Japan in 1987, and Final Fantasy games have been released almost every single year since. Fifteen games have been released as part of the main (numbered) series. Sequels, prequels, spin-offs, and related video games have been published, as well as numerous installments in other media forms. Each game in the main series takes place in a different fictional universe rather than serving as direct sequels to prior games, although some games have received sequels, or prequels, set in the same universe.

Most of the games have been re-released for several different platforms, many of which have been included in bundled releases. The series as a whole is primarily composed of role-playing video games, but also includes massively multiplayer online role-playing games, third-person shooters, tower defense games, and tactical role-playing games. Final Fantasy games have been released on over a dozen video game consoles beginning with the Nintendo Entertainment System, as well as for personal computers and mobile phones. The series is Square Enix's most successful franchise, having sold over 100 million units worldwide as of June 2011, across both the main series and its spin-offs. Final Fantasys popularity has placed it as one of the best-selling video game franchises.

Main series

Main series-related games

Ivalice Alliance

Compilation of Final Fantasy VII

Fabula Nova Crystallis Final Fantasy

Final Fantasy XV Universe

Subseries

Artniks

Brave Exvius

Chocobo

Crystal Chronicles

Crystal Defenders

Dimensions

Dissidia

Explorers

SaGa

Theatrhythm

Unlimited

World

Other games

Bundled releases

Branded subseries
These are groups of games or system-specific releases of games that are branded or marketed together. Unlike bundles, they were made available as individual products.

See also 
 List of Final Fantasy media
 Final Fantasy Trading Card Game
 List of Kingdom Hearts media

References 

Lists of video games by franchise
Video games